Nottingham Outlaws is the name of: 

Nottingham Outlaws (rugby league team)
Nottinghamshire County Cricket Club, in one day cricket and Twenty20 Cup games
Nottingham Outlaws, the name used by Long Eaton Speedway in 1979 and 1980